Progled Saddle (‘Sedlovina Progled’ \se-dlo-vi-'na 'pro-gled\) is the saddle of elevation 2517 m in Ellsworth Mountains, Antarctica connecting Evans Peak to Versinikia Peak on the side ridge that trends 8.8 km from the south rib of Mount Giovinetto on the main crest of north-central Sentinel Range northeastwards to Debren Pass.  It is part of the glacial divide between Patton Glacier to the southeast and the head of Rumyana Glacier to the northwest.

The saddle is named after the settlement of Progled in Southern Bulgaria.

Location
US mapping in 1961 and 1988.

Maps
 Vinson Massif.  Scale 1:250 000 topographic map.  Reston, Virginia: US Geological Survey, 1988.
 Antarctic Digital Database (ADD). Scale 1:250000 topographic map of Antarctica. Scientific Committee on Antarctic Research (SCAR). Since 1993, regularly updated.

Notes

References
 Progled Saddle. SCAR Composite Gazetteer of Antarctica
 Bulgarian Antarctic Gazetteer. Antarctic Place-names Commission. (details in Bulgarian, basic data in English)

External links
 Progled Saddle. Copernix satellite image

Ellsworth Mountains
Bulgaria and the Antarctic
Mountain passes of Ellsworth Land